Rentalachenu is a village in Vedurukuppam mandal in Chittoor district, Andhra Pradesh, India. It comes under Thirumallaiah palli panchayat and forms a part of the Rayalaseema region.

Demographics 

Telugu is the local language. Total population of Rentalachenu is estimated to be 300. Total area of Rentalachenu is 200 hectares.

References 

Villages in Chittoor district